San Nicolás de los Arroyos Partido is the northernmost partido in Buenos Aires Province, Argentina.

Settlements
Campos Salles
Conesa
Erézcano
General Rojo 
La Emilia
San Nicolás de los Arroyos
Villa Esperanza

External links

San Nicolás de los Arroyos  Website (Spanish)
San Nicolás de los Arroyos site (Spanish)

 
1748 establishments in South America
Partidos of Buenos Aires Province